Roma Termini (in Italian, Stazione Termini)  is the main railway station of Rome, Italy. It is named after the district of the same name, which in turn took its name from ancient Baths of Diocletian (in Latin, thermae), which lie across the street from the main entrance.

Overview
The station has regular train services to all major Italian cities, as well as daily international services to Munich, Geneva, and Vienna. With 33 platforms and over 180 million passengers each year, Roma Termini is the second largest railway station in Europe after Paris Gare du Nord.

Termini is also the main hub for public transport inside Rome. Two Rome Metro lines (A and B) intersect at Termini metro station, and a major bus station is located at Piazza dei Cinquecento, the square in front of the station. However, the main tram lines of the city cross at Porta Maggiore, some 1,500 metres east of the station.

On 23 December 2006, the station was dedicated to Pope John Paul II.

History

On 25 February 1863, Pope Pius IX opened the first, temporary Termini Station as the terminus of the Rome–Frascati, Rome–Civitavecchia and Rome-Ceprano lines.

The first two lines previously had separate stations elsewhere in the city, and, as the third line was under development, the city chose to build one central station, as opposed to the Paris model of having separate terminus stations for each line or each direction. The dilapidated Villa Montalto-Peretti, erected in the 16th century by Pope Sixtus V, was chosen as the site for this new station, which was to be called the "Stazione Centrale delle Ferrovie Romane" (Central Station of Roman Railways).

Construction of the permanent station began in 1868, in the last years of the Papal Temporal Power over the city of Rome, and was completed in 1874 after the Capture of Rome and installing of government of United Italy. It was laid out according to a plan by the architect Salvatore Bianchi. The front of this station reached Via Cavour, which means it extended some 200 metres deeper into the city than the current station.

In 1937, it was decided to replace the old station, as part of the planning for the 1942 World's Fair, which was never held because of the outbreak of World War II. The old station was demolished, and part of the new station was constructed, but in 1943, upon the collapse of the Italian fascist government, works were halted. The side structures of the design by Angiolo Mazzoni del Grande still form part of the present-day station.

The station building today

The current building was designed by the two teams selected through a competition in 1947: Leo Calini and Eugenio Montuori; Massimo Castellazzi, Vasco Fadigati, Achille Pintonello and Annibale Vitellozzi. It was inaugurated in 1950. The building is characterized by the linear lobby hall, a tall space of monumental dimensions. This great hall is fronted by full height glass walls, and is covered by a concrete roof that consists of a flattened and segmented arch, a modernist version of a barrel vault from a Roman bath. The vault is structurally integrated with a cantilevered canopy that extends over the entrance drive. The result is a gravity-defying modernist structure that also recalls a similar achievement of Roman architecture. The back of the hall leads to a transition space of ticketing functions and shops before reaching the train shed, and is topped by an even longer building block that houses a 10-story hotel, clad with travertine.

Access to the platforms can be gained on the main level and also via a subterranean passageway reached by escalators, both routes currently endowed with additional security measures.

Architecturally, the building expresses the sense of arrival in Rome, and communicates a sense of the Eternal City as both modern and traditional, looking forward to the future as well as remembering its history. Its bold presence in the urban fabric expresses the diversity of the city's history, and speaks of the dramatic new scale of the modern industrial economy of Italy.

The anodized aluminium frieze panels set in sequence along the length of the glass wall are the work of artist Amerigo Tot. The composition is said to relate to the theme of capturing the dynamics in sound and speed of a train.

Servian Walls
A length of the early 4th century BC Roman Servian Wall is preserved outside the station.

Interchanges 
   Termini interchange station for Line B and Line A on the Rome Metro.
  Roma Laziali station on the Rome–Giardinetti railway.
  5 – 14 (Tram Line) – H – 38 – 40 Express – 50 Express – 64 – 66 – 70 – 75 – 82 – 90 Express – 92 – 105 – 150F – 223 – 310 – 590 – 714 – 910 – nMA – nMB – nMB1 – n5 – n8 – n11 – n46 – n66 – n70 – n92 – n98 – n543 – n716 – C2 – C3

Train services
The services serving the station include the following (incomplete):

High speed services (Frecciarossa) Turin – Milan – Bologna – Florence – Rome – Naples – Salerno
High speed services (Italo) Turin – Milan – Bologna – Florence – Rome – Naples – Salerno
High speed services (Frecciarossa) Venice – Padua – Bologna – Florence – Rome – Naples – Salerno
High speed services (Italo) Venice – Padua – Bologna – Florence – Rome
High speed services (Frecciargento) Trieste – Venice – Padua – Bologna – Florence – Rome
High speed services (Frecciargento) Venice – Padua – Bologna – Florence – Rome
High speed services (Frecciargento) Venice – Padua – Bologna – Florence – Rome – Fiumicino Airport
High speed services (Frecciargento) Udine – Treviso – Venice – Padua – Bologna – Florence – Rome
High speed services (Frecciargento) Bolzano/Bozen – Verona – Bologna – Florence – Rome
High speed services (Frecciargento) Brescia – Verona – Bologna – Florence – Rome
High speed services (italo) Brescia – Verona – Bologna – Florence – Rome – Naples
High speed services (Frecciargento) Rome – Foggia – Bari – Brindisi – Lecce
High speed services (Frecciargento) Rome – Naples – Salerno – Lamezia Terme – Reggio di Calabria
High speed services (Frecciabianca) Turin – Genoa – La Spezia – Pisa – Livorno – Rome
High speed services (Frecciabianca) Milan – Genoa – La Spezia – Pisa – Florence – Rome
High speed services (Frecciabianca) Ravenna – Rimini – Foligno – Terni – Rome
High speed services (Frecciabianca) Rome – Naples – Salerno – Lamezia Terme – Reggio di Calabria
Intercity services Rome – Naples – Salerno – Lamezia Terme – Messina – Palermo / Siracusa
Intercity services Rome – Naples – Salerno – Lamezia Terme – Reggio di Calabria
Intercity services Rome – Naples – Salerno – Taranto
Intercity services Rome – Foggia – Bari (- Taranto)
Intercity services Ventimiglia – Genoa – La Spezia – Pisa – Livorno – Rome
Intercity services Turin – Genoa – La Spezia – Pisa – Livorno – Rome – Naples – Salerno
Intercity services Livorno – Civitavecchia – Rome – Naples
Intercity services Trieste – Venice – Padua – Bologna – Florence – Rome
Intercity services Ancona – Foligno – Terni – Rome
Intercity services Perugia – Foligno – Terni – Rome
Night train (EuroNight) Vienna – Klagenfurt – Villach – Venice – Bologna – Florence – Rome
Night train (CityNightLine) Munich – Wörgl – Innsbruck – Verona – Bologna – Florence – Rome
Night train (Intercity Notte) Trieste – Udine – Treviso – Venice – Padua – Bologna – Rome
Night train (Intercity Notte) Bolzano/Bozen – Verona – Rome
Night train (Intercity Notte) Rome – Foggia – Bari – Brindisi – Lecce
Night train (Intercity Notte) Rome – Naples – Messina – Palermo / Siracusa
Regional services (Leonardo Express) Rome – Fiumicino Airport
Regional services (Treno Regionale) Rome – Pomezia – Latina – Formia – Minturno – Naples
Regional services (Treno Regionale) Rome – Pomezia – Nettuno
Regional services (Treno Regionale) Rome – Venafro – Roccaravindola
Regional services (Treno Regionale) Rome – Ciampino – Zagarolo – Collefero – Frosinone
Regional services (Treno Regionale) Rome – Ciampino – Albano Laziale
Regional services (Treno Regionale) Rome – Ciampino – Velletri
Regional services (Treno Regionale) Civitavecchia – Cerveteri – Rome

In popular culture
Stazione Termini (1953)
Indiscretion of an American Wife (1954)
Come September (1961)

See also 

 History of rail transport in Italy
 List of railway stations in Lazio
 Rail transport in Italy
 Railway stations in Italy
 Roma Tiburtina railway station, the second-largest station in Rome
 Roma Ostiense railway station, the third-largest station in Rome

References

External links

 Official page at Grandistazioni website

Termini
Railway stations opened in 1862
Rome R. XV Esquilino
1862 establishments in the Papal States
Railway stations in Italy opened in the 19th century